Joseph Gregory Randa (born December 18, 1969) is a former Major League Baseball player. He was primarily a third baseman during his career. His nickname is "The Joker" due to his resemblance to the comic book character in Batman and his ever-present smile, especially during his plate appearances. It was given to him by Tony Muser, the Kansas City Royals manager during Randa's second tour with the ballclub. This had resulted from Muser having to constantly answer questions about why Randa was always smiling. "I'd tell them that's not a smile, it's his normal look", Muser explained.

High school years
Randa attended Kettle Moraine High School in Wales, Wisconsin, lettering in football, basketball, baseball, and tennis. Randa's #12 was retired by the Lasers. He is also a member of the Kettle Moraine Laser Trailblazer Hall of Fame.

Pro career
Randa played minor league for the Eugene Emeralds. He played the next three seasons as a competitive third baseman with three different teams, hitting .303, .302, and .254 for the Royals, Pittsburgh Pirates, and Detroit Tigers, respectively.

The Royals reacquired Randa prior to the  season. Installed as a full-time third baseman for the first time in his career, Randa hit .314 with 16 home runs and 84 RBIs, establishing himself as a run producer in the middle of the order and a steady fielder at third base. In 2003, Randa set the Kansas City Royals' team record for the most consecutive errorless games by a third baseman, going 75 games without an error. After the  season ended, Randa signed with the Cincinnati Reds as a free agent. On Opening Day, Randa hit the game-winning home run in the bottom of the 9th for Cincinnati in a 7-6 victory. On July 23, Randa was traded to the San Diego Padres for pitchers Justin Germano and Travis Chick. He was then signed by the Pirates on December 28, 2005 for a one-year contract worth between $3.5 and $4 million. On September 22, Randa broke up Padres pitcher Chris Young's no-hit bid with a pinch-hit home run in the 9th inning. On November 2, Randa announced his retirement. He batted .284/.339/.426 with 123 HRs and 739 RBIs in 1,522 games over 12 seasons.

Randa is one of only three players in Kansas City Royal history to collect six hits in a nine-inning game, which he did on September 9,  in the first game of a doubleheader against the Detroit Tigers at Comerica Park; he went 6-for-7 in a 26-5 Royal blowout win. Randa also scored six runs in that game; as of 2019, he is the most recent Major Leaguer to do so.

Randa made his first and only playoff appearance in 2005 with the Padres, hitting .364 in three games.

Post pro career
Randa works with the Royals' minor league teams as a special assistant.

See also

 List of Major League Baseball single-game hits leaders
 List of Major League Baseball single-game runs scored leaders

References

External links

1969 births
Living people
Major League Baseball third basemen
Baseball players from Milwaukee
Kansas City Royals players
Pittsburgh Pirates players
Detroit Tigers players
Cincinnati Reds players
San Diego Padres players
Memphis Chicks players
Omaha Royals players
Indian River State Pioneers baseball players
Tennessee Volunteers baseball players